Metopia is a genus of satellite flies in the family Sarcophagidae. There are at least 50 described species in Metopia.

Species
These 51 species belong to the genus Metopia:

M. albifrons (Linnaeus, 1761) c g
M. argentata Macquart, 1851 c g
M. argyrocephala (Meigen, 1824) c g i b
M. aurigans Pape, 1987 c g
M. auripulvera Chao & Zhang, 1988 c g
M. benoiti Zumpt, 1961 c g
M. biseriata (Macquart, 1851) c g
M. brasiliana (Townsend, 1929) c g
M. brincki Zumpt, 1959 c g
M. campestris (Fallén, 1810) c g
M. convexinevris (Macquart, 1851) c g
M. crassarista Pape, 1986 c g
M. cubitosetigera Pape, 1987 c g
M. deficiens Villeneuve, 1936 c g
M. fastuosa (Meigen, 1824) c g
M. flava Pape, 1987 c g
M. frontalis (Latreille, 1802) c g
M. grandii Venturi, 1953 c g
M. grisea (Robineau-Desvoidy, 1830) c g
M. hispidimana Pape, 1987 c g
M. inermis Allen, 1926 c g
M. italiana Pape, 1985 c g
M. juquiana (Townsend, 1934) c g
M. krombeini Sabrosky, 1953 c g
M. labiata (Fabricius, 1787) c g
M. lateralis (Macquart, 1848) c g
M. lateropili Allen, 1926 c g
M. lucipeda Reinhard, 1961 c g
M. malgache Zumpt, 1964 c g
M. monunguis Pape, 1986 c g
M. natalensis (Zumpt, 1961) c g
M. nudibasis (Malloch, 1930) c g
M. opaca Allen, 1926 c g i
M. palliceps (Bigot, 1881) c g
M. pauciseta Dodge, 1966 c g
M. perpendicularis Wulp, 1890 c g
M. pilosarista Pape, 1986 c g
M. polita (Townsend, 1935) c g
M. pollenia Chao & Zhang, 1988 c g
M. pulverulenta Pape, 1987 c g
M. rubricornis (Macquart, 1851) c g
M. sauteri (Townsend, 1933) c g
M. sinensis Pape, 1986 c g
M. sinipalpis Allen, 1926 c g
M. sinuata (Macquart, 1851) c g
M. staegerii Rondani, 1859 c g
M. suifenhoensis Fan, 1965 c g
M. togashii Kurahashi, 2004 c g
M. tshernovae Rohdendorf, 1955 c g
M. yunnanica Chao & Zhang, 1988 c g
M. zenigoi Kurahashi, 1970 c g

Data sources: i = ITIS, c = Catalogue of Life, g = GBIF, b = Bugguide.net

References

Further reading

External links

 

Sarcophagidae
Articles created by Qbugbot
Oestroidea genera
Taxa named by Johann Wilhelm Meigen